Sugawara (written: 菅原 lit. "sedge field"), also read as Sugahara, is a Japanese surname. Notable people with the surname include:

Sugawara no Kiyotomo (770–842), Japanese courtier and bureaucrat of the early Heian period
Sugawara no Michizane (845–903), Japanese scholar, poet, and politician of the Heian period
Sugawara no Koreyoshi (812–880), Japanese noble and scholar of the early Heian period
Bunta Sugawara (1933–2014), Japanese actor
Chieko Sugawara (born 1976), Japanese fencer
Hiroshi Sugawara (born 1955), Japanese film director, film producer, and screenwriter
Hirotaka Sugawara (born 1938), Japanese physicist
Isshu Sugawara (born 1962), Japanese politician
Julia Sugawara (born 1982), Canadian rugby union player
Kazuhiko Sugawara (born 1927), Japanese former speed skater
, Japanese bobsledder
Kota Sugawara (born 1985), Japanese football player
, Japanese footballer
Sadatoshi Sugawara (born 1939), Japanese former volleyball player
Shinobu Sugawara (born 1980), Japanese professional wrestler
Sayuri Sugawara (born 1990), Japanese singer
, Japanese hammer thrower
Taro Sugahara (born 1981), Japanese footballer
Takuya Sugawara (born 1983), Japanese professional wrestler
Tomo Sugawara (born 1976), Japanese football player
Tomoko Sugawara, Japanese harpist
, Japanese social activist and actor
Yasaburo Sugawara (born 1952), Japanese former wrestler
, Japanese rally driver
Yukinari Sugawara (born 2000), Japanese footballer

Japanese-language surnames